"Take Control" is a song by the American singer Amerie from her third studio album, Because I Love It (2007). It was released as the album's lead single on October 17, 2006. The song was written by Cee-Lo Green, Mike Caren and Amerie, and was produced by Caren, with additional production by Cee-Lo, Amerie and Len Nicholson. "Take Control" contains excerpts from the 1970 song "Jimmy, Renda-se" by the Brazilian musician Tom Zé, and elements of the 1980 song "You Make My Dreams" by Hall & Oates.

Recording
After Cee-Lo wrote the song, he approached Amerie to record it. Amerie felt the song was not up-tempo enough to suit her, so she wrote a hook, a bridge, and added a horn section to add to the song her "signature" and "a different flavour", making it a "dance record".

Tori Alamaze, the reference singer on the song, said that it was originally offered to her, but Amerie denied this, saying she thought it "really wack on [Alamaze's] part" to make such a claim.

Release and reception
Many critics gave "Take Control" positive reviews. Rolling Stone placed "Take Control" at number 92 on its list of The 100 Best Songs of the Year. Ryan Dombal of Entertainment Weekly wrote, "'Take Control' may be an ode to submission, but it hardly holds back." Tom Breihan of The Village Voice named "Take Control" the fifth best single release of the fourth quarter of 2006, commenting on "how great Amerie's joyous chirp sounds over sharp, percussive old-school funk tracks. Here, Cee-Lo laces her with spy-movie guitars and horn-stabs and a drum track that keeps building and building, adding on congas and handclaps and tambourines without ever disturbing the tense little groove at the song's center [...] and Amerie finally finds room for a bit of grit in her voice." The Guardians Alex Macpherson wrote that the track "twitches and jerks along a nagging Tom Zé sample, but it's a song with such a sparse arrangement that interest has to be sustained entirely by the voice, which Amerie does spectacularly, making it absolutely clear who is really cracking the whip".

According to Amerie, "Some Like It" was originally chosen as the first single from Because I Love It. Following the release of similar-sounding singles by Kelis ("Bossy"), Fergie ("London Bridge") and Justin Timberlake ("SexyBack"), and because Amerie thought "Take Control" was "kind of different", the decision was made to release it as the lead single instead.

The single entered the US Billboard Hot R&B/Hip-Hop Songs chart dated December 16, 2006, at number 72 and peaked two weeks later at number 66, while failing to chart on the Billboard Hot 100. After the single's underperformance, the US release of Because I Love It was pushed back repeatedly. Elsewhere, "Take Control" peaked at number 10 on the UK Singles Chart, becoming Amerie's second highest-charting single in the United Kingdom after "1 Thing", and also reached number nine in Finland, number 19 in Norway and number 23 in Ireland.

Music video
The music video was shot in late October 2006 and was premiered on the Internet on December 3. It was released to television in the United States on January 15, 2007, and was selected as MTV Jams's "Jam of the Week". Directed by Scott Franklin, it takes inspiration from Michelangelo Antonioni's 1966 film Blowup, with some of the key scenes recreated in a contemporary setting. Unlike the film, however, flashing captions onscreen make the assassination involved more obvious. Amerie and some acolytes are shown removing the photographer's blowups from his apartment, which is implied but not shown in the film. The video has a short introduction that involves Amerie singing another song from Because I Love It, "That's What U R".

Helin Jung of Entertainment Weekly called the video "nonsense, just the way I like my music videos to be" and "the stuff that music video dreams are made of [...] [it] pretends to make sense by taking on something more complex than Amerie shimmying around in hot pants and heels, but don't let it fool you. The hair tossing and strut-strutting is the same here as it is in '1 Thing', just on location this time—in a car, a park, a house with a sexy man sleeping under rumpled sheet, etc. Love it!"

Track listings

UK CD 1 and two-track digital single
German CD single and digital download
"Take Control" (Main Version) – 3:44
"Take Control" (Karmatronic Remix) – 3:26

UK CD 2
"Take Control" (Album Version) – 3:44
"Take Control" (Tracy's Taking Control Mix – Radio Edit) – 3:26
"That's What U R" (Album Version) – 3:38
"Take Control" (video)

German CD maxi single
"Take Control" (Album Version) – 3:44
"Take Control" (Karmatronic Mix) – 3:26
"That's What U R" (Album Version) – 3:38
"Take Control" (video)

French CD single and digital download
"Take Control" (Main Version) – 3:44
"Take Control" (Karmatronic Remix) – 3:26
"Crunk Didi (Losing U)" (featuring Willy Denzey and Six Coups MC) – 3:38

US 12-inch single
A1. "Take Control" (Main) – 3:44
A2. "Take Control" (Instrumental) – 3:41
A3. "Take Control" (A Cappella) – 3:35
B1. "That's What U R" (Main) – 3:38

UK 12-inch single
A1. "Take Control" (Album Version) – 3:44
A2. "Take Control" (Instrumental) – 3:41
B1. "Take Control" (Tracy's Taking Control Mix) – 3:26
B2. "Take Control" (Karmatronic Mix) – 3:26

Credits and personnel
Credits are adapted from the liner notes of Because I Love It.

Recording
 Recorded at Wonderland Studios (New Jersey)
 Mixed at Larrabee North Studios (Los Angeles, California)
 Mastered at Powers Studio (Florida)

Personnel

 Amerie – vocals, additional production, vocal production, arrangement
 Mike Caren – production
 Cee-Lo Green – additional production, vocal production, arrangement
 Len Nicholson – additional production
 Cornell "Nell" Brown – recording
 Manny Marroquin – mixing
 Jared Robbins – mixing assistance
 Herb Powers Jr. – mastering

Charts

Weekly charts

Year-end charts

Release history

References

2006 singles
2006 songs
Amerie songs
Columbia Records singles
Songs written by Amerie
Songs written by CeeLo Green
Songs written by Daryl Hall
Songs written by John Oates
Songs written by Mike Caren